Adolph Tidemand (14 August 18148 August 1876) was a noted Norwegian romantic nationalism painter. Among his best known paintings  are Haugianerne (The Haugeans; 1852) and Brudeferd i Hardanger (The Bridal Procession in Hardanger; 1848), painted in collaboration with Hans Gude.

Biography
Adolph Tidemand was born in Mandal, Norway as the son of customs inspector and Storting representative Christen Tidemand (1779–1838) and Johanne Henriette Henrikke Haste (1779–1859). He received private art lessons in his home town and his talent was soon recognized. He then was enrolled in an art school in Christiania, moving on to Copenhagen in the period 1832–1837. Upon arrival in Copenhagen, he was rejected by the Royal Danish Academy of Fine Arts and studied at a private school of art, but by 1833 he was a pupil at the Academy, earning Academy exhibitions in 1835 and 1836. He studied there for five years and then began a journey to Italy to study further. But when Tidemand came to Düsseldorf, Germany, he liked it so much that he settled down there.

From 1837 until 1841 he continued his studies at the art academy in Düsseldorf, which at the time enjoyed widespread international recognition.  He studied with and was influenced by his teacher, Theodor Hildebrandt. Here he prepared the well known Hjemvendte fiskere ved den sjællandske kyst (1838). The painting Gustav Vasa taler til dalalmuen i Mora kirke (1841) was sold to a German museum, but was later returned to Christiania. He is associated with the Düsseldorf school of painting.

In the autumn of 1841 he studied in Italy along with his brother Emil. Few of his works from this period remain, except for the picture Napolitansk fisker (1842). Tidemand was preoccupied by Norwegian history, particularly after returning on a journey to Norway. During a journey to 1843 in Hardanger, he met the 18-year-old Hans Gude. This resulted in a close friendship, and eventually they collaborated on several landscape paintings in which Tidemand painted the figures.

During 1842–1845 he traveled extensively in Norway (to Østerdalen, Gudbrandsdalen, Sogn, Hardanger and Telemark). More of his works survive from this period, including Eventyrfortellersken (1844), Søndagskveld i en hardangersk røkstue (1843) and Gudstjeneste i en norsk landsens kirke (1845). In his later travels in southern Norway, the last in 1875, Tidemand studied folk costumes, domestic utensils and building and made himself familiar with oral traditions, folk tales and legends. His version of rusticity proved highly popular and in 1848 he was commissioned by Oscar I, King of Sweden and Norway, to paint a series of Norwegian peasant life for the royal palace of Oscarshall, near Christiania.

Today Adolph Tidemand is best known for this depiction of Norwegian farm and culture and is counted among the first Norwegian historic painters. In Tidemand's paintings of the old Norwegian farm culture, he portrayed the peasant with a new dignity, humane and culturally. The National Museum of Art, Architecture and Design (Nasjonalgalleriet) in Oslo alone owns more than 100 of his works.

Personal life
He married in 1845 with his childhood sweetheart, Claudine Marie Bergitte Jæger (1817–1887). The couple settled in Düsseldorf in 1845. Their only child, a son, Adolph, died in 1874 at 28 years of age.

Tidemand was awarded the Royal Norwegian Order of St. Olav (Den Kongelige Norske St. Olavs Orden) in 1849, the French Legion of Honor (Légion d'honneur) in 1855 and the Swedish Order of the Polar Star (Nordstjärneorden) in 1866.

Better known works

 1838 –  Hjemvendte fiskere ved den sjællandske kyst
 1841 – Gustav Vasa taler til dalkarlene i Mora kirke
 1843 – Søndagskveld i en hardangersk røkstue
 1844 – Eventyrfortellersken 
 1845 – Søndagskveld i en røykstue i Hardanger
 1846 – Norsk juleskikk 
 1848 – Brudeferden i Hardanger (painted together with Hans Gude)
 1848 – Signe Halvorsdatter Valle i Sætersdalen
 1848 – Haugianerne (painted again in 1852)
 1849 – De ensomme gamle (Also known as Husandakt)
 1849 – Ingeborg Andersdatter Gulsvik, Flå, som brud
 1851 – Aften på Krøderen (painted together with Hans Gude)
 1852 – series Bondeliv i Oscarshall
 1852 – Haugianerne 
 1853 – Likferd på Sognefjorden (painted together with Hans Gude)
 1854 – Den foreldreløse
 1859 – Fiskere i havsnød (painted together with Hans Gude)
 1865 – Bestemors brudekrone 
 1865 – Fanatikerne 
 1874 – Syneve
 1874 – Nød

Gallery

References

Sources
Askeland, Jan. Adolph Tidemand og hans tid (Oslo: Aschehoug. 1991). 
Askeland, Jan. Norsk Malerkunst, Hovedlinjen gjennom 200år – uten stedsangivelse (Oslo: Aschehoug. 1981). .
Dietrichson, Lorentz. Adolph Tidemand, Hans Liv Og Hans Værker, Volumes 1-2 (Nabu Press. 1923). 
Noss, Aagot. Adolph Tidemand og folk han møtte, studiar frå reisene i norske dalføre, akvarellar, målarstykke og teikningar (Universitetsforlaget. 1981).  
Haverkamp, Frode. Adolph Tidemand 1814-1876, Hans Fredrik Gude 1825-1903 (Blaafarveværket, 1984). 

1814 births
1876 deaths
People from Vest-Agder
People from Mandal, Norway
19th-century Norwegian painters
Recipients of the Legion of Honour
Order of the Polar Star
Royal Danish Academy of Fine Arts alumni
Norwegian male painters
19th-century Norwegian male artists
Düsseldorf school of painting